Mark Noble is an English footballer.

Mark Noble may also refer to:
Mark Noble (sportsman) (born 1962), New Zealand chess and lawn bowls player
Mark Noble (biographer) (1754–1827), English clergyman, biographer and antiquary
Mark Noble (cyclist) (born 1963), British Olympic cyclist
Marc Noble of the Noble baronets, High Sheriff of Kent
Noble Johnson (1881-1978), professional name of actor/producer whose birth name was Mark Noble